Seventh Avenue South was a jazz club in New York City. It existed from 1977 to 1987.

The Seventh Avenue South was located in Greenwich Village, Manhattan (21 Seventh Avenue South/Leroy Street) and it was founded by the brothers Randy and Michael Brecker. Jazz musicians were performed there included Mike Mainieri, Mike Stern, Chuck Loeb, Bob Mintzer, Hiram Bullock, Wynton Marsalis, David Sanborn, Al Foster, Kazumi Watanabe, The club was a start-up for the fusion group Steps Ahead, Jaco Pastorius' Word of Mouth big band and the Bob Mintzer Big Band. Some live albums were made in the club: Native Son, Jaco Pastorius' Live in New York City, Steps/Steps Ahead and Mike Mainieri.

References 

1977 establishments in New York City
1987 disestablishments in New York (state)
Defunct jazz clubs in New York City
Former music venues in New York City
Nightclubs in Manhattan
Greenwich Village